James Manning Tyler (April 27, 1835 – October 13, 1926) was an American politician, lawyer and judge from Vermont. He served as a U.S. Representative from Vermont.

Early life and education

Tyler was born in Wilmington, Vermont, the son of Ephraim Tyler and Mary (Bissell) Tyler. He attended the Brattleboro Academy. He graduated from Albany Law School and was admitted to the bar in September 1860.

Career 
After completing his legal studies, Tyler began the practice of law in Wilmington.

He served as member of the Vermont House of Representatives in 1863 and 1864, and as State's attorney in 1866 and 1867. He was a trustee of the Brattleboro Retreat from 1875 until 1926, and a Trustee of the Vermont Asylum for the Insane from 1875 until 1926.

Tyler was elected as a Republican candidate to the Forty-sixth and Forty-seventh Congresses, serving from March 4, 1879 until March 3, 1883. He declined to be a candidate for renomination in 1882.

After serving in Congress, he resumed the practice of his profession in Brattleboro, Vermont. Among the prospective attorneys who studied under him was Frank L. Fish, who later served as an associate justice of the Vermont Supreme Court. Tyler was appointed to succeed William H. Walker as a judge on the Vermont Supreme Court in September 1887 and served until his resignation on December 1, 1908. He served as president of the Vermont National Bank from 1917 until 1923, and as president of the Vermont-Peoples' National Bank in 1923 and 1924.

Personal life 
Tyler married Jane Pearson Miles on September 1, 1875. They had one child who died in infancy.

Tyler died on October 13, 1926 in Brattleboro, Vermont, and is interred in the Prospect Hill Cemetery in Brattleboro.

References

External links 
 
 Biographical Directory of the United States Congress: TYLER, James Manning, (1835 - 1926)
 
 The Political Graveyard: Tyler, James Manning (1835-1926)
 Govtrack.us: Rep. James Tyler
 Our Campaigns: Tyler, James Manning

1835 births
1926 deaths
People from Wilmington, Vermont
Republican Party members of the United States House of Representatives from Vermont
Republican Party members of the Vermont House of Representatives
People from Brattleboro, Vermont
Justices of the Vermont Supreme Court
Vermont lawyers
Albany Law School alumni
State's attorneys in Vermont
19th-century American lawyers